The 2008 3M Performance 400 Presented by Bondo was the twenty-third race of the 2008 NASCAR Sprint Cup season held on August 17 at Michigan International Speedway in Brooklyn, Michigan. ESPN carried the  race beginning at 1 PM US EDT and MRN along with Sirius Satellite Radio had radio coverage starting at 1:15 PM US EDT.

Pre-Race News
 As announced at Watkins Glen last week, Brad Coleman becomes the driver of the #96 Hall of Fame Racing Toyota Camry, replacing J. J. Yeley, who was released.  P. J. Jones was at the wheel during the Centurion Boats at the Glen.

Qualifying
Brian Vickers won the first pole for Team Red Bull on August 15.  Jimmie Johnson would join him on the front row.

Race Recap
Roush Fenway Racing took four of the top five places, and all five RFR cars were in the top ten as Carl Edwards won the race.  Only the Joe Gibbs Racing #18 Toyota driven by points leader Kyle Busch spoiled the parade, finishing second.

Results

References

3M Performance 400
3M Performance 400
NASCAR races at Michigan International Speedway